Robert Picard is a former American football wide receiver who spent three years in the NFL with the Philadelphia Eagles, Seattle Seahawks, and Detroit Lions. He played college football at Eastern Washington.

College career
Picard walked on to NAIA Eastern Washington State, which is now known as Eastern Washington. He played four years as a wide receiver, setting career records for catches (166), yards (2,373), and touchdowns (19). These marks stood for 22 years until they were broken in 1993. He had his number 84 jersey retired, making him one of only two players to have received this honor at Eastern Washington, the other being Michael Roos.

Professional career
Picard was selected by the Philadelphia Eagles in the sixth round of the 1973 NFL Draft. He spent three seasons with the Eagles, making his mark primarily on special teams. He was selected in the 1976 NFL Expansion Draft by the Seattle Seahawks, but he was cut in training camp. He then returned to the Philadelphia Eagles for four games before being traded mid-season to the Detroit Lions, where he would play the final eight games of his career.

Picard never caught a regular season pass in the NFL, but his play on special teams was renowned. One Philadelphia sportswriter once said of Picard that "Of all the Philadelphia Eagles, the easiest one to find in the locker room is Bobby Picard. He's the one covered with all the blood. Number 82 in your program, but No. 1 in the kamikaze ranks. The guy who looks like a walking transfusion."

References

External links
Bob Picard at Pro Football Reference

1949 births
Living people
People from Omak, Washington
American football wide receivers
Eastern Washington Eagles football players
Philadelphia Eagles players
Seattle Seahawks players
Detroit Lions players
Players of American football from Washington (state)